The Kingdom of Northern Lusitania (Portuguese: Reino da Lusitânia Setentrional) was a kingdom proposed by Napoleon in 1807 for the king of Etruria, Charles Louis, located in the North of Portugal.

In 1807 Portugal refused Napoleon's demand to accede to the Continental System of embargo against the United Kingdom. Napoleon, having signed the Treaty of Fontainebleau on 27 October 1807, with Spain, defined the occupation of Portugal, proposing that the country would be divided into three different states:
the Kingdom of Northern Lusitania (in the north of Portugal, between the rivers Douro and Minho and including main cities as Porto and Braga; named after the Roman province of Lusitania and to be ruled by the deposed king of Etruria, Charles II;
Portugal (reduced to the region between the rivers Douro and Tagus, including the capital city of Lisbon; to be ruled directly by France);
the Principality of the Algarves (corresponding to all southern Portugal, south of the river Tagus, including the regions of the Algarve and Alentejo), to be ruled by the prime minister of Spain, Manuel de Godoy, Napoleon's ally, with the title of prince.

A French invasion under Marshal Junot followed, and the capital city of Lisbon was captured on 1 December 1807. British intervention in the Peninsular War, under Arthur Wellesley, 1st Duke of Wellington, helped to maintain Portuguese independence, the last French troops being expelled in 1812.

See also
Treaty of Fontainebleau (1807)
History of Portugal (1777-1834)
Timeline of Portuguese history
Entre-Douro-e-Minho Province

Napoleonic Wars
19th century in Portugal
Political history of Portugal
Proposed countries